Geovani Faria da Silva (born 6 April 1964 in Vitória), referred to simply as Geovani Silva or Geovani, is a Brazilian former footballer who played as a midfielder.

He began his career at 16 in Desportiva Ferroviária. In 1983, he was transferred to Vasco da Gama, where he became famous, playing alongside the likes of Romário and Roberto Dinamite. He represented Brazil at the 1983 FIFA World Youth Championship, where he became the top scorer, and was also elected as the best player of the tournament. He scored the only goal in the final, where Brazil beat Argentina 1–0.

He received 24 senior international caps, from May 1985 to September 1991, and was a member of the Brazilian team in the 1988 Summer Olympics, winning a silver medal.  He also played for the Brazilian team which won the Copa América in 1989.  Geovani was not selected for Brazil at the World Cup.

Between 1989 and 1991 he played in Europe at Bologna F.C. 1909 and Karlsruher SC, before moving back to Vasco da Gama. For the rest of his career he played for various Brazilian clubs, with a brief stint at Tigres UANL in Mexico. He ended his career in 2002.

In 2006, he was elected as State Deputy of the state of Espirito Santo.

Honours

Club
 Rio de Janeiro State Championship: 1982, 1987, 1988, 1992, 1993
 Espírito Santo State Championship: 1980, 1981, 1998, 1999, 2000

International
Brazil
 Summer Olympics:  1988
 Copa América: 1989
 FIFA U-20 World Cup: 1983

Individual
 FIFA U-20 World Cup Golden Ball: 1983
 FIFA U-20 World Cup Golden Shoe: 1983
 South American Player of the Year (El Mundo): 1988 (3rd place)
 South American Team of the Year: 1988

References

External links
 

Living people
1964 births
People from Vitória, Espírito Santo
Association football midfielders
Brazilian footballers
Brazil international footballers
Brazilian expatriate footballers
Desportiva Ferroviária players
CR Vasco da Gama players
Bologna F.C. 1909 players
Karlsruher SC players
Tigres UANL footballers
Campeonato Brasileiro Série A players
Serie A players
Bundesliga players
Expatriate footballers in Germany
Expatriate footballers in Italy
Expatriate footballers in Mexico
Olympic medalists in football
1989 Copa América players
Brazil under-20 international footballers
Footballers at the 1988 Summer Olympics
Olympic footballers of Brazil
Medalists at the 1988 Summer Olympics
Olympic silver medalists for Brazil
Copa América-winning players
Members of the Legislative Assembly of Espírito Santo
Sportspeople from Espírito Santo